Salvatore "Pippo" Carrubba (born 6 August 1962) is a former Italian paralympic archer who won a gold medal at the 2000 Summer Paralympics.

References

External links
 

1962 births
Living people
Paralympic archers of Italy
Paralympic gold medalists for Italy
Paralympic medalists in archery
Archers at the 2000 Summer Paralympics
Archers at the 2004 Summer Paralympics
Medalists at the 2000 Summer Paralympics
People from Ragusa, Sicily
Sportspeople from the Province of Ragusa